Shadows and Light is the seventh album released by Canadian country music singer Charlie Major. The album was written entirely by Major, and includes a duet with Kim Mitchell ("Young at Heart").

Track listing
All tracks written by Charlie Major.
 "Simple Plan" - 5:00
 "Better World" - 3:57
 "That’s When I Feel Loved" - 4:07
 "You’ll See Angels" - 4:56
 "There’s No Easy Way to Say Goodbye" - 4:37
 "Young at Heart" - 3:56
duet with Kim Mitchell
 "Whispering Your Name" - 4:19
 "True Love Street" - 3:24
 "Shadows and Light" - 4:46
 "Already Gone" - 4:18
 "Mandy" - 4:40

Charlie Major albums
2006 albums
E1 Music albums